Halothamnus lancifolius is a species of the plant genus Halothamnus, that belongs to the subfamily Salsoloideae within the family Amaranthaceae, (formerly Chenopodiaceae). It occurs in Southwest Asia.

Morphology 
Halothamnus lancifolius is a sub-shrub up to 45 cm high, with blueish-green pale-striped branches. The leaves are flat, somewhat fleshy, lanceolate-triangular or linear-triangulate, and up to 43 mm long and 1,9-4,5 mm wide, decurrent at their base for 1–5 mm along the stem. The bracts and bracteoles are flat and lanceolate, the bracteoles obliquely standing off, basally with membraneous margins. The flowers are 3,8-4,8 mm long with lanceolate-oval tepals, the stigmas are rounded at their tip. The winged fruit is 9–14 mm in diameter, their wings inserting below the middle, the tepal lobes forming a steep cone. The tube of the fruit is cylindric, its bottom with deep furrow-like, linear or curved pits.

Distribution 
The distribution of  Halothamnus lancifolius covers Syria, Israel and Palestine, Jordan, western Iraq, Egypt (Sinai) and northwestern Saudi Arabia. It grows on stony ground, often on salty soils, from 400 m below sea level up to 1500 m above sea-level.

Taxonomy 
The species has been first described in 1853 by Pierre Edmond Boissier as Caroxylon lancifolium (In: Diagnoses plantarum orientalium novarum, ser. 1,12, Neocomi, 1853, p. 98). Gabriele Kothe-Heinrich classified it at species rank into the genus Halothamnus in 1993. Within the genus, it belongs to section Halothamnus.

Synonyms
Caroxylon lancifolium  Boiss.
Salsola lancifolia (Boiss.) Boiss.
Aellenia lancifolia (Boiss.) Ulbr.
Aellenia glauca (Bieb.) Aellen subsp. lancifolia (Boiss.) Aellen
Aellenia lancifolia (Boiss.) Aellen, nom.inval.

Vernacular names
Hebrew:  אֵלֶנְיָה אִזְמֵלָנִית

References

External links 

 Photos of Halothamnus lancifolius in Flora of Israel online
 Halothamnus lancifolius at Tropicos

lancifolius
Taxa named by Pierre Edmond Boissier